Unión Deportiva Villa de Santa Brígida is a Spanish football team based in Santa Brígida, Las Palmas, in the autonomous community of Canary Islands. Founded in 2004, it plays in Tercera División RFEF – Group 12, holding home matches at Estadio de los Olivos, with a capacity of 600 seats.

History
Unión Deportiva Villa Santa Brígida was founded in 2004, after the merger between Club Deportivo Santa Brígida and Sociedad Deportiva Santa Brígida. It first reached the third division three years later, lasting two seasons in the category. In June 2019 Israel Quintana became the new head coach of the club.

Club background
Club Deportivo Santa Brígida - (1984–2004) → ↓
Unión Deportiva Villa Santa Brígida - (2004–)
Sociedad Deportiva Santa Brígida - (1965–2004) → ↑''

Season to season

2 seasons in Segunda División B
14 seasons in Tercera División
1 season in Tercera División RFEF

Honours
Tercera División: 2015–16

Famous players
 Héctor Figueroa
 José María Ojeda
 Antonio Robaina
 Jerónimo Santana

See also
UD Villa de Santa Brígida B, reserve team

References

External links
Official website 
Futbolme team profile 
Club's history 

Football clubs in the Canary Islands
Sport in Gran Canaria
Association football clubs established in 2004
2004 establishments in Spain